Hamyaneh (also Romanized as Hamyāneh and Hamiyāna; also known as Hambāneh) is a village in Silakhor Rural District, Silakhor District, Dorud County, Lorestan Province, Iran. At the 2006 census, its population was 119, in 32 families.

References 

Towns and villages in Dorud County